FreshMinistries is a non-profit organization based in Jacksonville, Florida which goal is to eradicate poverty, improve race relations and build stronger communities. The group focuses on economic development, job training and health initiatives in core-city Jacksonville and is also engaged in international projects.

History
The organization was founded in 1994 by the Rev. Dr. Robert V. Lee, III, an Episcopal priest who was rector at Church of Our Saviour (Jacksonville, Florida) for more than a decade. In its early years, the group focused on programs to promote financial literacy, youth mentoring, housing development and crime prevention, particularly in East Jacksonville. Dr. Lee continues to serve as CEO of the organization.

Current initiatives
FreshMinistries has worked to achieve the United Nations' Millennium Development Goals (MDG) to eliminate poverty through a number of initiatives. Current projects include: 

Fresh Futures Youth Program, helping more than 100 young people each year gain life skills and summer employment. Fresh Futures is a year-round educational and youth employment initiative for youth ages 14–19. The program focuses on using education and social outreach to help adolescents set healthy goals, succeed in school and work, and improve their mental and physical well-being.  Qualifying students are placed in summer jobs, thanks to partnerships with employers throughout the community.
Fresh Path Youth Program, offering a new start to youth who have come into contact with the criminal justice system. The mission of this program, funded with a grant from the U.S. Department of Labor, is to address the educational and employment barriers of court-involved youth and young adults while helping them develop the employment skills needed to obtain good jobs. The program equips court-involved youth with skills to enable them to find work and earn higher wages and helps participants move forward successfully by combining the most promising workforce and juvenile justice strategies available.
LifePoint Career Institute, which has trained more than 900 unemployed and underemployed individuals for employment in the hospitality and healthcare fields. Eighty-seven percent of program graduates gain employment and retain their jobs for more than 9 months. The Institute provides training in nursing, hospitality and aquaponics farming. Curriculum includes job-specific training, self-management, money management, problem solving, time management, grooming, and developing self-esteem. Job search assistance includes classes on setting personal goals, workplace procedures, resume writing, completing applications, work ethics and interviewing. In addition, LifePoint provides a substantial computer learning center. 
Beaver Street Enterprise Center, the region's only core-city business incubator, was launched as an initiative of FreshMinistries, Inc., with support from the Jacksonville Economic Development Corporation, and opened its doors in 2003. Located in the City's northwest quadrant in both State Enterprise and Federal Empowerment Zones, the Center has helped launch more than 100 new businesses, created more than 2000 new jobs and generated more than $300 million in economic impact. BSEC was voted International Business Incubator of the Year by the National Business Incubator Association in 2010.
Native Fresh Aquaponics: FreshMinistries opened a 6,000-square-foot aquaponics training center in Jacksonville in 2017, raising fish and marketable produce. In 2015, FreshMinistries received a $1.98 million grant from the U.S. Economic Development Administration to launch an aquaponics training center in the U.S. Virgin Islands, which is under development.

2010 Haiti earthquake response
In the wake of the 2010 Haiti earthquake, FreshMinistries and its international arm, Be The Change International (BTCI) were asked by the U.S. Department of Health and Human Services to coordinate a major aid and relief operation there. The organizations' emergency relief effort shipped to the Haitian people many supplies, including three ambulances (one of which was delivered to the Haitian government), emergency aid, food, water, water purification systems, clothing, school supplies, large generators, and 147 large tents to serve as temporary schools and shelter.

Local support
Tom and Betty Petway made a $1 million gift donation in December, 2003. The couple had worked with the organization since the late 1990s and respected the work the group does. Petway was CEO of Zurich Insurance Services and said at the time: "We're impressed with the work FreshMinistries has done in Jacksonville in creating opportunities for people of all races and faith traditions to participate economically and socially in our community. The organization needs the financial backing to continue the work it has started in the community, including assisting with other service organizations and ministries in the city."
FreshMinistries used the money for several existing programs, including the Beaver Street Enterprise Center business incubator, youth programs, college internships and financial literacy initiatives.

The organization has also received considerable support from Jacksonville philanthropists Delores and Wayne Weaver. The organization's east Jacksonville community center, the Weaver Center for Community Outreach, is named in honor of the couple.

FreshMinistries receives ongoing state support through the Florida Department of Children and Families, as well as private contributions.

AIDS grant
FreshMinistries received $10 million of $100 million in abstinence-focused grants awarded by the United States Agency for International Development, part of the President Bush's Emergency Plan for AIDS Relief. The grant funded Siyafundisa, an initiative to provide ongoing HIV/AIDS prevention programs in Africa.  The grant is the largest the ministry has received.

References

External links
FreshMinistries official website

Non-profit organizations based in Jacksonville, Florida
Community building
Charities based in Florida
Religious charities based in the United States
Organizations established in 1994